Pete is a nickname of:

 Russell "Pete" Ashbaugh (1921–2009), American football player
 Pedro Pete Astudillo (born 1963), Mexican American songwriter
 Darrel Pete Brewster (1930–2020), American former National Football League player and coach
 Wilson Pete Burness (1904–1969), American animator and animation director, two-time Academy Award winner
 Clarence Pete Carpenter (1914–1987), American jazz trombonist, musical arranger and composer for television shows
 Charles "Pete" Conrad (1930–1999), American naval aviator and astronaut
 Richard Pete Cooper (golfer) (1914–1993), American PGA golfer
 Ulise Joseph Pete Desjardins (1907–1985), American diver, double gold medalist at the 1928 Olympics
 Pietro Pete Domenici (1932–2017), American politician and six-term senator from New Mexico
 Pierre S. du Pont IV (born 1935), American lawyer, politician and former Governor of Delaware
 Dee Pete Hart (American football) (born 1933), American football player
 Wilbur Pete Henry (1897–1952), American National Football League player and coach
 William J. Knight (1929–2004), American aeronautical engineer, politician, Vietnam War combat pilot, test pilot and astronaut
 Ralph Pierre Pete LaCock, Jr. (born 1952), American former Major League Baseball player
 Warren "Pete" Moore (1938–2017), American singer-songwriter, original bass singer for Motown group The Miracles and record producer
 George Pete Morrison (1890–1973), American silent western film actor
 Linton Pete Muldoon (1887–1929), Canadian hockey coach, first coach of the Chicago Black Hawks
 Charles Pete Orr (racing driver) (1956–2002), American stock car racing driver
 Harding William Pete Peterson (baseball) (1929–2019), American retired Major League Baseball player and general manager
 Harold Patrick Pete Reiser (1919–1981), American Major League Baseball player
 Alvin Pete Rozelle (1926–1996), longtime commissioner of the National Football League
 James Pete Runnels (1928–1991), American Major League Baseball player
 Petros Pete Sampras (born 1971), American retired tennis player
 Kenneth Pete Shaw (American football) (born 1954), American former National Football League player
 Alonzo Pete Tillman (1922–1998), American football player and coach

See also
 Henry Ole Pete Peterson, American folk legend

Lists of people by nickname